John Tavares (born September 20, 1990) is a Canadian professional ice hockey forward and captain of the Toronto Maple Leafs of the National Hockey League (NHL). He was selected first overall by the New York Islanders in the 2009 NHL Entry Draft, where he spent nine seasons and served as captain for five seasons.

Previously, Tavares competed at the major junior level as a member of the Oshawa Generals of the Ontario Hockey League (OHL) before being traded to the London Knights at the 2009 OHL trading deadline along with Michael Del Zotto. Tavares broke into the OHL after gaining "exceptional player" status at age 14, allowing the Generals to select him in the OHL Priority Draft as an underage player in 2005. Tavares was named the Canadian Hockey League (CHL) Rookie of the Year in 2006 and CHL Player of the Year in 2007. Tavares finished his Major Junior and OHL career with most goals (215), and 6th in points (433).

Tavares was the focus of an unsuccessful push to have the NHL's draft rules changed to allow him to participate in the 2008 Entry Draft, as well as an attempt to allow him to play in the American Hockey League (AHL) as a 17-year-old in 2007. Tavares was ranked as the top prospect for the 2009 Draft by both the NHL Central Scouting Bureau and International Scouting Services.

Tavares has represented Canada at five International Ice Hockey Federation (IIHF)-sanctioned events, including the 2010 and 2011 World Championships. At the under-20 level, he won gold medals at the 2008 and 2009 World Junior Ice Hockey Championships. He was named the most valuable player of the 2009 tournament after scoring eight goals and 15 points in six games. He also participated in the 2006 IIHF World U18 Championships, but failed to medal. Additionally, Tavares represented Team Ontario at the 2006 World U-17 Hockey Challenge and 2007 Super Series. On January 7, 2014, he was named to the 2014 Canadian Olympic Hockey Team, winning a gold medal at the 2014 Winter Olympics despite an injury preventing him from participating in the final two games.

Early career
Tavares was born on September 20, 1990 in Mississauga, Ontario, to Barbara and Joe Tavares, who are of Polish and Portuguese descent, respectively. His maternal grandparents, Bolesław and Josephine Kowal, immigrated from Poland to Sudbury, Ontario, and his paternal grandparents Manuel and Dorotea Tavares immigrated from Portugal to Toronto, Ontario. At a very young age, Tavares moved to Oakville, Ontario. This is where he was first exposed to minor hockey through the Minor Oaks Hockey Association. Tavares also played soccer and lacrosse, and his highly competitive nature often led him to fight with other players. Tavares excelled at lacrosse, following in the footsteps of his uncle John Tavares, the all-time scoring leader in the National Lacrosse League (NLL), and was a ball boy for his uncle's NLL team, the Buffalo Bandits. The younger Tavares credits his uncle with teaching him the importance of remaining unselfish, stating what he learned by following his uncle with the Bandits has made him better both as a person and a hockey player. Many skills he learned in lacrosse—such as spinning off checks and battling in traffic—transferred to ice hockey and improved Tavares' abilities as a goal scorer.

In Oakville, Tavares attended St. Thomas Aquinas Catholic Secondary School. He lived five minutes from Sam Gagner, who later signed a contract with the Edmonton Oilers, and the two quickly established a friendship. Gagner's father, former NHL player Dave Gagner, built a backyard ice rink on which Tavares spent much of his time honing ice hockey skills. In the OHL, Tavares placed an emphasis on his education, earning honours as well as the Oshawa Generals' Scholastic Player of the Year in 2007–08. Tavares also spends some of his time working with the Special Olympics.

Tavares showed such promise as a hockey player that when he was seven, his parents moved him up one age group and he began playing with older children. From there, he moved on to the Mississauga Braves of the Greater Toronto Hockey League (GTHL). After playing the 1998–99 season with the Braves' novice team, Tavares moved to the Mississauga Senators of the GTHL the following season. With the Senators' AAA minor atom team, Tavares won the GTHL minor atom championship in the 1999–2000 season. Tavares eventually moved to the Toronto Marlboros of the GTHL. During the 2003–04 season Tavares was teammates with his friend Sam Gagner, and scored 95 goals and 187 points in 90 games to lead the Marlboros' bantam team to the 2004 Bantam AAA Provincial Hockey Championships, where the Marlboros defeated Drew Doughty and the London Jr. Knights 5–0 in the championship game. Tavares scored one goal in the game and was named the tournament's top forward. The following season, Tavares joined the Marlboros' minor midget team, where he recorded 91 goals and 158 points in 72 games. For his achievements, Tavares shared the Buck Houle Award with Bryan Cameron, "in recognition of outstanding on ice performance, leadership and loyalty". During this season, he also played 16 games with the Milton Icehawks of the Ontario Provincial Junior A Hockey League (OPJHL), during which he recorded 11 goals and 23 points. Tavares' debut with the Icehawks came while he was only 13, making him one of the youngest players to ever play junior hockey.

Playing career

Junior

Tavares petitioned to gain eligibility to play major junior in the Ontario Hockey League (OHL) in the spring of 2005. As OHL rules did not allow for players under age 15 to be drafted, the OHL introduced an "exceptional player" clause, allowing the 14-year-old Tavares to be drafted one year sooner than he would otherwise have been eligible. Consequently, Tavares is the youngest player to ever be drafted in the OHL, although Bobby Orr was signed and had played at a younger age. The Canadian Hockey League (CHL), the umbrella organization which governs major junior hockey in Canada, sent a proposal to Hockey Canada recommending that the rule be expanded across junior hockey, which eventually was granted. To date, only seven other players—Aaron Ekblad, Connor McDavid, Sean Day, Joe Veleno, Shane Wright Connor Bedard and Michael Misa—have been granted the same status.

The Oshawa Generals held the first pick in the 2005 draft, and they selected Tavares, earning him the Jack Ferguson Award, which is given to the player picked first overall in the OHL Priority Selection. Tavares played his first OHL game on September 23, 2005, scoring his first OHL goal in a game held just three days after his 15th birthday. He showed he could play in the OHL immediately, scoring ten goals in his first nine games with the Generals, and finished the 2005–06 season with 77 points, including 45 goals. Tavares was named to the OHL's all-rookie team, and won both the Emms Family Award and CHL Rookie of the Year awards as the top first-year player in both the OHL and CHL respectively.

As a 16-year-old in 2006–07, Tavares was selected to represent the OHL for two games in January for the annual ADT Canada-Russia Challenge, including one game in Oshawa. Later that month, on January 25, 2007, Tavares registered a seven-point night in a 9–6 win against the Windsor Spitfires. He scored four goals and three assists, including his 50th goal of the season in his 44th game. Towards the end of the season, on March 16, 2007, Tavares recorded his 70th and 71st goals of the season, breaking Wayne Gretzky's OHL record for most goals by a 16-year-old. He was awarded the Red Tilson Trophy as the most outstanding player in the league, and named the CHL Player of the Year.

Tavares scored 40 goals in 59 games for the Generals during the 2007–08 season, while his 118 points was placed him third in OHL scoring. Tavares led the OHL in scoring until he missed several games to represent the Canada men's national junior ice hockey team at the 2008 World Junior Ice Hockey Championships. As Tavares was participating in the 2009 World Junior Ice Hockey Championships, it was speculated that the Generals were ready to trade him to the London Knights. Tavares' future with the Generals had been questioned since the beginning of the season as the Generals were not expected to seriously contend for the championship, while the Knights were among the league leaders. The deal was made official on January 8, 2009, as Oshawa sent Tavares, Michael Del Zotto and Darryl Borden to the Knights in exchange for Scott Valentine, Christian Thomas, Michael Zador and six draft picks.

Tavares made his debut with the Knights on January 11 against the Mississauga St. Michael's Majors. Making his return to Oshawa at the 2009 CHL Top Prospects Game as captain of Team Orr, he recorded an assist in a 6–1 win over Team Cherry, but injured his shoulder after Zack Kassian of the Peterborough Petes checked him behind the net. On March 8, 2009, Tavares set the OHL goal-scoring record with his 214th goal, passing the previous record held by Peter Lee. The next day, he received his third OHL Player of the Week recognition of the season.

Professional
Although he was born five days after the September 15 cutoff date for eligibility in the 2008 NHL Entry Draft, there was a significant effort made to allow Tavares into the Draft. Following his 72-goal campaign in 2006–07, Tavares' agents asked the NHL and NHL Players' Association (NHLPA) to make an exception for Tavares similar to the one the OHL had made in 2005. The attempt was unsuccessful and Tavares was required to wait until 2009 to participate in the NHL Entry Draft. In October 2007, it was reported that then-Toronto Maple Leafs general manager John Ferguson Jr. had offered the 17-year-old Tavares a spot with the team's American Hockey League (AHL) affiliate, the Toronto Marlies. However, like the NHL, the AHL declined to amend its by-laws and Tavares subsequently returned to the OHL.

The NHL International Scouting Services ranked Tavares as the top draft prospect in the world, ahead of defenceman Victor Hedman and forwards Magnus Pääjärvi-Svensson and Matt Duchene in its March 2009 update. The 2009 draft class was led by Tavares, who was selected first overall by the New York Islanders.

New York Islanders (2009–2018)

On July 15, 2009, Tavares signed a three-year, entry-level contract with the Islanders. His first NHL game was in the pre-season in a game against the Edmonton Oilers. He spent 22 minutes and 50 seconds on the ice alongside linemates Doug Weight and Sean Bergenheim in the Islanders' 3–2 loss. Weight, a veteran NHLer, said, "John's going to be a big piece of [an Islander rebuilding effort]." Tavares scored his first career NHL goal and assist in his first ever professional game, scoring on a backhander against Marc-André Fleury of the Pittsburgh Penguins on October 3, 2009.

Tavares led NHL rookies in scoring throughout much of his first season. In December 2009, he scored five consecutive Islanders goals over a four-game span to tie the club record for most consecutive goals by one player. He scored an empty-net goal against the Atlanta Thrashers on December 3, and both Islanders goals on both December 9 against the Philadelphia Flyers and December 10 against the Toronto Maple Leafs. The record was originally set by Bryan Trottier, when he scored five consecutive goals in a 1982 game against Philadelphia. On March 17, 2010, Tavares scored five points (two goals and three assists) in a 5–2 win over the Vancouver Canucks. At the end of the season, Tavares finished second in rookie scoring, behind Matt Duchene, with 54 points.

As New York opened up their season at home against the Dallas Stars on October 9, 2010, Tavares suffered a mild concussion late during the first period. The Stars' Adam Burish bumped into Tavares, and the latter was unable to return to the game. He scored his first career hat-trick on October 23, 2010, in a loss to the Florida Panthers. He then scored his second career NHL hat-trick, as well as his first career natural hat-trick, on January 15, 2011, in a win against the Buffalo Sabres.

On September 14, 2011, Tavares signed a new six-year, $33 million contract with the Islanders effective from the 2012–13 season through to the end of the 2017–18 season. After being held pointless in the first two games of the 2011–12 season, Tavares had back-to-back four-point games against the Tampa Bay Lightning and New York Rangers. From December 29, 2011, to January 21, 2012, Tavares had 21 points in a 12-game point streak, seven of which were multi-point games. He was selected to play in the 2012 NHL All-Star Game. In his first career All-Star Game, he recorded one goal and one assist. Additionally, during the 2011–12 season, Tavares was named as an alternate captain for New York.

Tavares played with Mark Streit in Switzerland for SC Bern while the 2012–13 NHL lock-out took place. During the shortened 2012–13 season, Tavares was third in the NHL with 28 goals. He helped the Islanders reach the Stanley Cup playoffs for the first time since 2007, scoring 47 points in 48 games. Tavares was also named a finalist for the 2013 Hart Memorial Trophy, awarded to the NHL's most valuable player, on May 10, 2013. Tavares scored his first career Stanley Cup playoff goal against Pittsburgh goaltender Marc-André Fleury in Game 3 of the 2013 playoffs. He would finish with three goals and five points in six games as the Islanders were eliminated by the Penguins.

On September 9, 2013, Tavares was named as the 14th captain in New York Islanders history, replacing former Islander Mark Streit of the Philadelphia Flyers, who served as team captain since 2011. On February 19, 2014, during the 2014 Winter Olympics, Tavares suffered a torn medial collateral ligament (MCL) and a torn meniscus in his knee during the quarterfinal game against Latvia, forcing him to miss the remainder of the Olympics as well as the remainder of the Islanders' season. At the time of his injury, Tavares ranked third in the NHL with 66 points in 59 games. The following season, he was selected for the 2015 NHL All-Star Game, along with teammate Jaroslav Halák. Tavares finished the 2014–15 NHL season as runner up for the Art Ross Trophy with 86 points, one point behind the recipient, Dallas Stars forward Jamie Benn. Additionally, Tavares was named a finalist for the Hart Memorial Trophy for the second time in his career; ultimately ceding the award to Carey Price.

On April 19, 2015, Tavares scored 15 seconds into overtime against Washington Capitals goaltender Braden Holtby in Game 3 of the Eastern Conference Quarterfinals of the 2015 playoffs. The goal, which gave the Islanders a 2–1 victory, was the first game-winning overtime goal in the playoffs for the Islanders since 1993. Despite this, the Capitals won the series in seven games.

Tavares scored the first regular season goal for the Islanders at Barclays Center in a 3–2 overtime loss to the Chicago Blackhawks during the first game of the 2015–16 NHL season. On March 12, 2016, Tavares scored his 200th career NHL goal in a game against the Boston Bruins. That season, he was also named to the NHL All-Star Game for the third time in his career and was voted captain of the Metropolitan Division.

On April 24, 2016, Game 6 of the Eastern Conference Quarterfinals against the Florida Panthers, trailing 1–0 in the final minute of play, assisted by Nikolay Kulemin and Nick Leddy, Tavares scored the game-tying goal off a loose puck in the crease with 53.2 seconds left in regulation. He finished the job by scoring the series-clinching goal in double overtime, winning a playoff series for the Islanders for the first time since 1993.

On January 13, 2017, in a game against Florida, Tavares scored his 500th NHL point in his 550th career NHL game, making him the first player from his draft class to reach the milestone.

Tavares' contract with the Islanders was set to expire following the completion of the 2017–18 season, during which he recorded 84 points in 82 games. With Tavares set to become an unrestricted free agent for the first time in his career, he decided to test the free-agent market by meeting with six teams in the days leading up to the opening of the signing window on July 1, including a meeting with the Islanders to contemplate re-signing before hitting free agency. Although many analysts predicted that Tavares would sign a new contract with New York before he hit the open market, the re-sign deadline passed without a new contract being signed, and Tavares officially became a free agent at noon (EDT) on July 1. Many publications called Tavares the biggest free agent in the modern history of the NHL. Just before 1 pm, almost one hour into the free agency period, it became public knowledge that Tavares had informed the Islanders he would be leaving the team and signing with Toronto.

Toronto Maple Leafs (2018–present)
On July 1, 2018, it was announced that Tavares had signed a seven-year, $77 million contract with the Toronto Maple Leafs. Tavares cited "Toronto's chances as a Stanley Cup contender, as well as living out his childhood dream to play for his hometown team", as his reason for signing the contract. Tavares rejected higher-paying offers in favour of joining the Maple Leafs, including a seven-year, $91 million offer from the San Jose Sharks that would've made Tavares the highest-paid player in the NHL. 

In his debut for the Maple Leafs on October 4 against the Montreal Canadiens, Tavares scored his first goal for the club in a 3–2 overtime win. On October 7, Tavares recorded his ninth career NHL hat-trick (and first for Toronto) in a 7–6 overtime victory over the Chicago Blackhawks. Tavares made his first return to Long Island to play the Islanders on February 28, 2019, in a highly-publicized, sold-out game. Tavares was relentlessly booed and heckled by Islanders fans throughout the match, including during his tribute video, and items were thrown at Tavares on the ice. The Islanders would win the game 6–1, scoring six unanswered goals after Toronto initially scored early in the game. On March 17, Tavares recorded his 700th career NHL point with his 40th goal of the season in a 6–2 loss to the Ottawa Senators; in scoring that goal, Tavares also became the third player in Maple Leaf history to record 40 goals in his first season with the team. On March 26, Tavares recorded his tenth career NHL hat-trick (and first four-goal game) in a 7–5 win over the Florida Panthers. In so doing, he became just the third player in modern team history (since 1943) to record multiple hat-tricks in his debut season with the club, following Wilf Paiement and Daniel Marois. In the Maple Leafs' next game against the Islanders, Tavares recorded his 87th point of the season (a new career-high and his first point against his former team) in the 2–1 win, which clinched a playoff berth for Toronto.

Prior to the 2019–20 season, Tavares was granted leave from the teams first pre-season game in St. John's, Newfoundland and Labrador to spend with his wife and newborn son. On October 2, 2019, just before the first game of the NHL season, Tavares was named the 25th captain in the history of the Maple Leafs, filling a position that had been vacant for more than  years since the trade of Dion Phaneuf.

On April 5, 2021, Tavares recorded his 800th career NHL point with an assist in the Maples Leafs' 5–3 win over the Calgary Flames.

On May 20, 2021, in the Leafs' opening Stanley Cup Playoff game against the Canadiens, Tavares was upended by Canadiens defencemen Ben Chiarot. Canadiens forward Corey Perry attempted to jump over Tavares as he fell to the ice, however, Perry's knee clipped Tavares in the head. Ultimately, Tavares was stretchered off the ice and was transported to the hospital. After the game, Perry felt remorse for his role on the incident: "I don’t know what else to do there. I tried to jump. I know Johnny pretty well and just hope he’s OK." Tavares was taken to St. Michael's Hospital, and was discharged the following day, but was ruled out indefinitely with a concussion. In his absence, the Leafs would rally to win three games in a row, but would ultimately lose the series to the Canadiens in seven games, surrendering a 3–1 series lead in the process.

On January 29, 2023, Tavares played his 1000th NHL game, a 5–1 victory against the Washington Capitals; he nabbed 2 assists in that game.

International play

Junior
During his rookie season in the OHL, Tavares competed for Team Ontario in the 2006 World U-17 Hockey Challenge in Saskatchewan as a 15-year-old, but failed to medal. Later that year, at the end of the 2005–06 season, he was selected to join Canada's under-18 team for the 2006 IIHF World U18 Championships in Sweden, but failed to medal once more, falling to the Czech Republic in the bronze medal game. Later in the off-season, he was invited to the under-18 team's summer training camp to prepare for the 2006 Ivan Hlinka Memorial Tournament in the Czech Republic and Slovakia, though an injury ultimately prevented him from participating.

During the following season, Tavares was invited to Canada's national junior selection camp in preparation for the 2007 World Junior Championships, but was not named to the final roster. After completing his second OHL season, however, Tavares was named to the Canada's junior team for the 2007 Super Series against Russian junior players. He scored four goals and one assist as Canada won the series 7–0–1.

Tavares earned another invite to the selection camp for the 2008 World Junior Championships and made the final roster for the tournament on his second attempt. He scored four goals to help Canada to its fourth-straight gold medal in the competition. Returning the next year, along with Zach Boychuk, P. K. Subban and Thomas Hickey from the previous year's gold medal-winning team, Tavares was selected to compete in the 2009 World Junior Championships in Ottawa, Ontario. He scored three points in the first round-robin game against the Czech Republic, an 8–1 win, and was named Player of the game. In the final round-robin game against the United States, Tavares scored a hat-trick for his 12th career goal of the tournament to tie Eric Lindros and Jeff Carter for the all-time Canadian junior record. In doing so, Tavares helped propel Canada to a 7–4 win that gave them the top spot in their pool and a subsequent bye to the tournament semifinal. He was also named Player of the game for the second time in the tournament for his performance on the night. Meeting Russia in the semifinal and down 5–4 with less than ten seconds left in regulation, Tavares fought off two Russian players along the boards and backhanded a shot towards the goal. The shot was blocked by defenceman Dmitri Kulikov a few feet in front of the net, but after the puck came loose, teammate Jordan Eberle retrieved it and sent it into the right side of the net to dramatically tie the game with 5.4 seconds left. Then, as the game was forced into a shootout, Tavares scored to put Canada up 2–0 in the tie-breaker and into the gold medal game against Sweden. Recording an assist in the final, he helped Canada defeat the Swedes 5–1 to capture their fifth-straight gold medal. Tavares finished the tournament with eight goals and seven assists for 15 points in six games, second only to teammate Cody Hodgson in tournament scoring. Tavares was also named one of the top three players on the Canadian team by its coaching staff, as well as a tournament All-Star, Top Forward and MVP.

Senior

As the New York Islanders failed to qualify for the playoffs in Tavares' rookie season in the NHL, he was selected to the Canadian men's team for the 2010 IIHF World Championship in Germany. Canada General Manager Mark Messier made a specific effort to assemble a young team; as a result, Tavares was one of five teenagers on the final roster. With seven goals in seven games, Tavares led all tournament players in goal-scoring. Despite recording no assists, he ranked fifth in points. He helped Canada to the quarterfinal against Russia, where they were defeated 5–2.

The following year, Tavares returned to the national team for the 2011 IIHF World Championship in Slovakia. He improved to nine points over seven games with five goals and four assists to lead Canada in scoring; he ranked fifth among all tournament players for the second consecutive year. As Canada again reached the quarterfinal, they were eliminated once more by Russia, losing 2–1. Tavares was chosen by coaches as one of the three best players on Team Canada, along with defenceman Alex Pietrangelo and forward Andrew Ladd.

Tavares played for SC Bern in Switzerland during the 2012–13 NHL lock-out and quickly became the PostFinance Top Scorer, tallying 42 points—including 17 goals—in just 28 games. He also played for Team Canada at the 2012 Spengler Cup, which the nation ultimately won after defeating HC Davos in the final.

At the 2014 Winter Olympics, Tavares injured his knee in Canada's quarterfinal match, rendering him unable to play for the remainder of the tournament as well as the 2013–14 NHL season.

On 26 April 2019, it was announced that Tavares had committed to play for Team Canada at the 2019 IIHF World Championship in Slovakia. However, shortly before the first game of the tournament, it was announced on 9 May 2019 that Tavares had suffered an oblique injury and would be returning to Toronto.

Playing style

Tavares has been praised by his coaches for his ability to anticipate the play since he joined the OHL. A lack of speed had been the most common criticism of Tavares' play, something he spent his junior career attempting to improve. Tavares' skating speed is something he greatly improved since turning professional.

The media hype he has encountered has led Tavares to remain guarded when speaking to the media, while his teammates and family attempt to shield him from the spotlight where they can. However, Tavares is regarded as a natural leader on the ice, and a player who puts his team first. The Oshawa Generals named Tavares their team captain in 2008, while he also served as the alternate captain with the Canadian junior team in 2009.

Career statistics

Regular season and playoffs

International

Awards and honours

Notes

References

External links

 
 John Tavares at the Internet Movie Database

1990 births
Living people
Canadian expatriate ice hockey players in the United States
Canadian ice hockey centres
Canadian people of Polish descent
Canadian people of Portuguese descent
Ice hockey people from Ontario
Ice hockey players at the 2014 Winter Olympics
London Knights players
Medalists at the 2014 Winter Olympics
National Hockey League All-Stars
National Hockey League first-overall draft picks
National Hockey League first-round draft picks
New York Islanders draft picks
New York Islanders players
Olympic gold medalists for Canada
Olympic ice hockey players of Canada
Olympic medalists in ice hockey
Oshawa Generals players
Sportspeople from Mississauga
Sportspeople from Oakville, Ontario
Toronto Maple Leafs players